End of the Trail may refer to:

 End of the Trail (1932 film), an American Western film
 End of the Trail (1936 film), an American Western film
 End of the Trail (Fraser), a sculpture by James Earle Fraser in Waupun, Wisconsin, US
 End of the Trail (Wanlass), a sculpture by Stanley Wanlass in Seaside, Oregon, US
 The End of the Trail, a 2000 Hardy Boys novel
 The End of the Trail Museum, at the Trees of Mystery park near Klamath, California, US

See also
 Trail's End (disambiguation)